Marlin Independent School District was a public school district based in Marlin, Texas, United States. The district serves students in eastern Falls County.

In 2009, the school district was rated "academically acceptable" by the Texas Education Agency. In 2010, the high school, middle school, and learning center were all rated academically acceptable as well.

In 2015 the district had about 900 students.

The district superintendent is Dr. Darryl Henson, who was selected in 2020.

History

Michael Seabolt became the superintendent in 2015.

Marlin ISD received an "academically unacceptable" rating from the Texas Education Agency (TEA) in 2011. In 2013 and 2014 the TEA gave it "improvement required". In September 2015 the TEA sent a letter stating that it planned to revoke the accreditation as of July 1, 2016, which would lead to the closure of the district. Stephanie Butts of the Waco Tribune-Herald wrote that the announcement caught Marlin ISD officials "off guard".

In response, Marlin ISD filed a request for an informal review of the closure. The announcement resulted in a meeting being held by the Saved Our Schools volunteer organization. In November 2015 the TEA gave a temporary reprieve requiring academic improvement.

In August 2016 the district received another poor rating from the TEA, but instead of closing the district the TEA moved to take over its operations.

Marlin ISD's TEA accreditation was revoked in 2018.

Schools
Marlin High School (Grades 9-12)
Marlin Junior Academy (Grades 6-8) - Middle school
Marlin Primary Academy (Grades PK-5) - Elementary school

The elementary and middle school campuses were previously Marlin Elementary School and Marlin Middle School, but in 2015 the names were changed due to a rule from the TEA.

References

Further reading
 Letter from the TEA renouncing the revocation of Marlin ISD's accreditation (2015)
 "BREAKING NEWS - Marlin ISD given one-year reprieve." The Marlin Democrat. Thursday November 12, 2015.
 "Marlin ISD could learn fate soon." The Marlin Democrat. Thursday November 12, 2015.
 "TEA Commissioner Williams visits MISD campuses." The Marlin Democrat. Thursday November 5, 2015.

External links
Marlin ISD

School districts in Falls County, Texas
Marlin, Texas